José Vítor Jardim Vieira (born 11 February 1982), commonly known as Zé Vítor, is a Portuguese footballer who plays as a right midfielder.

Football career
Born in Funchal, Madeira, Zé Vítor started playing professionally with C.S. Marítimo in his hometown, but never appeared officially for the first team, also being loaned to a third division club. He was definitely released in 2003, signing with another neighbouring side, A.D. Machico of the fourth level.

In the summer of 2006, Vítor joined C.D. Nacional – still in Madeira – making his Primeira Liga debut on 27 August by coming from the bench in a 0–1 away loss against former team Marítimo. He went on to appear in a further 30 league matches, leaving in the 2008 January transfer window to FC St. Gallen of Switzerland.

After suffering relegation in his first Swiss Super League season, Zé Vítor helped the club return to division one in the following year. He moved countries again in 2010, signing for AEL Limassol in Cyprus.

References

External links

1982 births
Living people
Sportspeople from Funchal
Portuguese footballers
Madeiran footballers
Association football midfielders
Primeira Liga players
Liga Portugal 2 players
Segunda Divisão players
C.S. Marítimo players
C.D. Nacional players
Swiss Super League players
Swiss Challenge League players
FC St. Gallen players
Cypriot First Division players
Cypriot Second Division players
AEL Limassol players
Apollon Limassol FC players
Enosis Neon Paralimni FC players
Nikos & Sokratis Erimis FC players
Karmiotissa FC players
Super League Greece players
Veria F.C. players
Portuguese expatriate footballers
Expatriate footballers in Switzerland
Expatriate footballers in Cyprus
Expatriate footballers in Greece
Portuguese expatriate sportspeople in Switzerland
Portuguese expatriate sportspeople in Cyprus